Statistics of Primera Fuerza in season 1925-26.

Overview
It was contested by 7 teams, and América won the championship.

League standings

This table includes four goals of a tie between América and Club España; this match was awarded to América because the players of Club España left the field during the game. The goals counted by determination of the league.

Championship Playoff

Top goalscorers
Players sorted first by goals scored, then by last name.

References
Mexico - List of final tables (RSSSF)

1925-26
Mex
1925–26 in Mexican football